Kundar River is located in Balochistan, Pakistan.

Rivers of Balochistan (Pakistan)
Rivers of Pakistan